Narcosis may refer to:

In science
 Carbon dioxide narcosis, carbon dioxide retention leading to a reduction in the hypoxic drive
 Hydrogen narcosis, an effect of diving deep with hydrogen
 Nitrogen narcosis, an effect of diving deep with nitrogen
 Unconsciousness induced
 by a narcotic drug
 through anesthesia

In music
Narcosis (Peruvian band), a punk band
"Narcosis", a song by Tomahawk from the album Tomahawk, 2001

See also
 Narcolepsy, a chronic neurological disorder
 Necrosis, a form of cell injury that results in the premature death of cells
 Sleep